Richard Monroe Miles (born January 8, 1937) is an American diplomat.

Life
Richard Miles was born in Little Rock, Arkansas on January 8, 1937. He grew up in rural and small-town Indiana. After serving in the Marine Corps from 1954 to 1957, he obtained degrees from Bakersfield College, the University of California at Berkeley and Indiana University. He is also a graduate of the U.S. Army Russian Institute, Garmisch-Partenkirchen, Germany.

Miles worked for the South Carolina Voter Education Project from 1964 to 1967 in the field of voter registration and political leadership training.

Miles married the former Sharon Alice O'Brien in 1960. The couple have two children: Richard Lee Miles was a Police Officer in Richmond, Virginia for many years. Elizabeth Anne Miles-Masci is a freelance editor and lives in Alexandria, Virginia.

Foreign service career
He entered the Foreign Service in 1967 and served abroad in Oslo, Belgrade, Moscow, and as Consul General in Leningrad (now Saint Petersburg), and as Principal Officer of the U.S. Embassy Office in Berlin.

Miles served as Ambassador to Azerbaijan from 1992 to 1993, as Chief of Mission to Serbia-Montenegro from 1996 to 1999, as Ambassador to Bulgaria from 1999 to 2002 and as Ambassador to Georgia from 2002 to 2005.

In the State Department, he also worked in the Office for Soviet Affairs and the Office for East European and Yugoslav Affairs and in the Bureau of Political-Military Affairs.

Ambassador Miles worked for Senator Ernest F. Hollings (D-SC) on an American Political Science Fellowship in 1983-1984, and in 1987-1988 he was a fellow at Harvard University's Center for International Affairs.

Miles retired from the State Department in August, 2005. From April, 2006 until December, 2006, he served as Executive Director of the Open World Leadership Center headquartered in the Library of Congress. In November, 2008, Ambassador Miles was recalled to active duty to serve as Charge of the American Embassy in Ashgabat, Turkmenistan. He returned to Washington, DC and retirement in September, 2009. In February, 2015, he was asked to go to Bishkek, Kyrgyzstan to serve as Charge of the American Embassy there. He returned to Washington and retirement in September, 2015.

Miles has been awarded the State Department's Meritorious Honor Award and Group Superior Honor Award (twice). In 1992 he was awarded a Presidential Meritorious Service Award and a national award for reporting. In 2004 he was the recipient of the State Department's Robert C. Frasure Award for peaceful conflict resolution.

References

 [www.adst.org ADST Homepage] (oral history memoirs)

External links

|-

|-

|-

1937 births
Living people
Ambassadors of the United States to Azerbaijan
Ambassadors of the United States to Bulgaria
Ambassadors of the United States to Georgia (country)
Harvard Fellows
Indiana University alumni
People from Little Rock, Arkansas
University of California, Berkeley alumni
United States Foreign Service personnel
United States Marines